Djibril Moussa Souna (born May 7, 1992 in Niamey, Niger) is a Nigerien footballer. He currently plays as a defender for Nigerien side AS GNN. He is a member of Niger national football team, called at 2012 Africa Cup of Nations.

References

External links
 

1992 births
Living people
Nigerien footballers
Niger international footballers
Association football defenders
2012 Africa Cup of Nations players
People from Niamey
Niger A' international footballers
2011 African Nations Championship players